Events from the year 1869 in Sweden

Incumbents
 Monarch – Charles XV

Events

10 July – Gävle is largely destroyed in a fire; 80% of its 10,000 residents are left homeless.
 Malmö SS is founded. 
 Women are allowed to work in the railway office.

Births
 10 April – Signe Bergman, women's right activist (died 1960)
 28 June – Lydia Wahlström, historian and women's rights activist (died 1954) 
 2 July – Hjalmar Söderberg, writer (died 1941) 
 21 October – Stina Berg, actress (died 1930) 
 6 December – Otto Nordenskjöld, geologist, geographer and polar explorer (died 1928)

Deaths

 28 January – Sophie Bolander, writer (born 1807)
 22 September – Ulrika Sofia De Geer, countess and salonnière (born 1793)
 12 November – Carl Georg Brunius, classical scholar, art historian, archaeologist and architect (born 1793)

References

 
Years of the 19th century in Sweden
Sweden